Rybinsk Reservoir, informally called the Rybinsk Sea, is a water reservoir on the Volga River and its tributaries Sheksna and Mologa, formed by Rybinsk Hydroelectric Station dam, located in the Tver, Vologda, and Yaroslavl Oblasts. At the time of its construction, it was the largest man-made body of water on Earth. It is the northernmost point of the Volga. The Volga-Baltic Waterway starts from there. The principal ports are Cherepovets in Vologda Oblast and Vesyegonsk in Tver Oblast.

The construction of the dam in Rybinsk started in 1935. The filling of the reservoir started on April 14, 1941, and continued until 1947. Some 150,000 people had to be resettled elsewhere, and the historic town of Mologa in Yaroslavl Oblast along with 663 villages have completely disappeared under water. Today the dam is less important for hydroelectric power supply (output is 346 MW) than it used to be.

References

External links 
 Detailed map of the reservoir (in Russian)
 Webpage of the Leushino Monastery, now submerged under the waters of the Rybinsk Sea (in Russian)

Reservoirs built in the Soviet Union
Reservoirs in Russia
Reservoirs in Tver Oblast
Reservoirs in Vologda Oblast
Reservoirs in Yaroslavl Oblast
Volga basin